The 1977 Arizona State Sun Devils baseball team represented Arizona State University in the 1977 NCAA Division I baseball season. The Sun Devils played their home games at Packard Stadium. The team was coached by Jim Brock in his 6th season at Arizona State.

The Sun Devils won the College World Series, defeating the South Carolina Gamecocks in the championship game.

Roster

Schedule 

! style="background:#FCC626;color:#990033;"| Regular Season
|- valign="top"

|- align="center" bgcolor="#ddffdd"
| February 16 ||  || 12–7 || 1–0 || –
|- align="center" bgcolor="#ddffdd"
| February 16 || Azusa Pacific || 15–3 || 2–0 || –
|- align="center" bgcolor="#ddffdd"
| February 18 ||  || 4–2 || 3–0 || –
|- align="center" bgcolor="#ddffdd"
| February 19 || Loyola Marymount || 9–4 || 4–0 || –
|- align="center" bgcolor="#ddffdd"
| February 19 || Loyola Marymount || 10–1 || 5–0 || –
|- align="center" bgcolor="#ddffdd"
| February 21 ||  || 7–5 || 6–0 || –
|- align="center" bgcolor="#ddffdd"
| February 21 || Chapman || 7–6 || 7–0 || –
|- align="center" bgcolor="#ddffdd"
| February 22 || Chapman || 22–8 || 8–0 || –
|- align="center" bgcolor="#ddffdd"
| February 25 ||  || 5–4 || 9–0 || –
|- align="center" bgcolor="#ddffdd"
| February 26 || Cal State Fullerton || 7–3 || 10–0 || –
|- align="center" bgcolor="#ffdddd"
| February 26 || Cal State Fullerton || 8–9 || 10–1 || –
|- align="center" bgcolor="#ddffdd"
| February 28 ||  || 9–8 || 11–1 || –
|-

|- align="center" bgcolor="#ddffdd"
| March 1 || La Verne || 8–2 || 12–1 || –
|- align="center" bgcolor="#ddffdd"
| March 3 ||  || 7–5 || 13–1 || –
|- align="center" bgcolor="#ffdddd"
| March 4 || Southern California || 9–12 || 13–2 || –
|- align="center" bgcolor="#ddffdd"
| March 5 || Southern California || 8–4 || 14–2 || –
|- align="center" bgcolor="#ddffdd"
| March 6 ||  || 8–6 || 15–2 || –
|- align="center" bgcolor="#ddffdd"
| March 7 ||  || 6–5 || 16–2 || –
|- align="center" bgcolor="#ddffdd"
| March 8 || UNLV || 7–0 || 17–2 || –
|- align="center" bgcolor="#ddffdd"
| March 10 ||  || 14–0 || 18–2 || –
|- align="center" bgcolor="#ddffdd"
| March 11 ||  || 6–4 || 19–2 || –
|- align="center" bgcolor="#ddffdd"
| March 11 || Fresno State || 4–3 || 20–2 || –
|- align="center" bgcolor="#ddffdd"
| March 12 || Fresno State || 9–5 || 21–2 || –
|- align="center" bgcolor="#ffdddd"
| March 14 || at UNLV || 12–14 || 21–3 || –
|- align="center" bgcolor="#ddffdd"
| March 15 || at UNLV || 13–8 || 22–3 || –
|- align="center" bgcolor="#ddffdd"
| March 17 || at Southern California || 10–3 || 23–3 || –
|- align="center" bgcolor="#ffdddd"
| March 18 || at Southern California || 8–10 || 23–4 || –
|- align="center" bgcolor="#ffdddd"
| March 19 || at Southern California || 6–9 || 23–5 || –
|- align="center" bgcolor="#ffdddd"
| March 23 || at  ||  8–9 || 23–6 || –
|- align="center" bgcolor="#ddffdd"
| March 24 ||  || 18–8 || 24–6 || –
|- align="center" bgcolor="#ddffdd"
| March 24 ||  ||  10–3 || 25–6 || –
|- align="center" bgcolor="#ddffdd"
| March 25 ||  ||  11–6 || 26–6 || –
|- align="center" bgcolor="#ddffdd"
| March 26 ||  || 10–8 || 27–6 || –
|- align="center" bgcolor="#ddffdd"
| March 26 || Arizona ||  8–7 || 28–6 || –
|- align="center" bgcolor="#ffdddd"
| March 29 || at  || 0–3 || 28–7 || –
|- align="center" bgcolor="#ffdddd"
| March 29 || at Hawaii || 0–6 || 28–8 || –
|- align="center" bgcolor="#ddffdd"
| March 30 || at Hawaii || 7–0 || 29–8 || –
|- align="center" bgcolor="#ddffdd"
| March 30 || at Hawaii || 13–3 || 30–8 || –
|-

|- align="center" bgcolor="#ddffdd"
| April 8 || at  || 4–1 || 31–8 || 1–0
|- align="center" bgcolor="#ffdddd"
| April 9 || at New Mexico || 1–2 || 31–9 || 1–1
|- align="center" bgcolor="#ffdddd"
| April 9 || at New Mexico || 2–4 || 31–10 || 1–2
|- align="center" bgcolor="#ddffdd"
| April 15 ||  || 15–0 || 32–10 || 2–2
|- align="center" bgcolor="#ddffdd"
| April 15 || UTEP || 21–4 || 33–10 || 3–2
|- align="center" bgcolor="#ddffdd"
| April 16 || UTEP || 13–2 || 34–10 || 4–2
|- align="center" bgcolor="#ffdddd"
| April 21 || at Arizona || 6–9 || 34–11 || 4–3
|- align="center" bgcolor="#ddffdd"
| April 22 || at Arizona || 10–4 || 35–11 || 5–3
|- align="center" bgcolor="#ddffdd"
| April 23 || at Arizona || 13–6 || 36–11 || 6–3
|- align="center" bgcolor="#ddffdd"
| April 26 || Grand Canyon || 15–2 || 37–11 || –
|- align="center" bgcolor="#ddffdd"
| April 28 || New Mexico || 12–4 || 38–11 || 7–3
|- align="center" bgcolor="#ddffdd"
| April 29 || New Mexico || 11–2 || 39–11 || 8–3
|-

|- align="center" bgcolor="#ddffdd"
| May 3 || at Northern Arizona || 17–10 || 41–11 || –
|- align="center" bgcolor="#ddffdd"
| May 6 || at UTEP || 27–1 || 42–11 || 10–3
|- align="center" bgcolor="#ddffdd"
| May 7 || at UTEP || 4–2 || 43–11 || 11–3
|- align="center" bgcolor="#ddffdd"
| May 7 || at UTEP || 17–1 || 44–11 || 12–3
|- align="center" bgcolor="#ddffdd"
| May 11 || Arizona || 5–4 || 45–11 || 13–3
|- align="center" bgcolor="#ddffdd"
| May 12 || Arizona || 7–2 || 46–11 || 14–3
|- align="center" bgcolor="#ddffdd"
| May 14 || Arizona || 11–7 || 47–11 || 15–3
|- align="center" bgcolor="#ddffdd"
| May 19 ||  || 7–2 || 48–11 || –
|- align="center" bgcolor="#ddffdd"
| May 20 || BYU || 8–1 || 49–11 || –
|-

|-
! style="background:#990033;color:white;"| Post-Season
|-

|- align="center" bgcolor="ddffdd"
| May 27 || vs. Cal State Fullerton || Packard Stadium || 6–2 || 50–11
|- align="center" bgcolor="ddffdd"
| May 28 || vs.  || Packard Stadium || 11–7 || 51–11
|- align="center" bgcolor="ddffdd"
| May 29 || vs. Washington State || Packard Stadium || 3–2 || 52–11
|-

|- align="center" bgcolor="ddffdd"
| June 10 || vs. Clemson || Rosenblatt Stadium || 10–7 || 53–11
|- align="center" bgcolor="ffdddd"
| June 13 || vs.  || Rosenblatt Stadium || 2–3 || 53–12
|- align="center" bgcolor="ddffdd"
| June 14 || vs. Minnesota || Rosenblatt Stadium || 8–4 || 54–12
|- align="center" bgcolor="ddffdd"
| June 16 || vs. South Carolina || Rosenblatt Stadium || 6–2 || 55–12
|- align="center" bgcolor="ddffdd"
| June 17 || vs. Southern Illinois || Rosenblatt Stadium || 10–0 || 56–12
|- align="center" bgcolor="ddffdd"
| June 18 || vs. South Carolina || Rosenblatt Stadium || 2–1 || 57–12
|-

Awards and honors 
Jamie Allen
 College World Series All-Tournament Team

Chris Bando
 First Team All-WAC

Hubie Brooks
 First Team All-American

Mike Henderson
 College World Series All-Tournament Team
 First Team All-WAC

Bob Horner
 College World Series Most Outstanding Player
 First Team All-American
 First Team All-WAC

Dave Hudgens
 First Team All-American
 First Team All-WAC

Brandt Humphry
 College World Series All-Tournament Team

Darrell Jackson
 First Team All-WAC

Chris Nyman
 College World Series All-Tournament Team

Rick Peters
 First Team All-American
 First Team All-WAC

Jerry Vasquez
 College World Series All-Tournament Team

Sun Devils in the 1977 MLB Draft 
The following members of the Arizona State Sun Devils baseball program were drafted in the 1977 Major League Baseball Draft.

References 

Arizona State
Arizona State Sun Devils baseball seasons
College World Series seasons
NCAA Division I Baseball Championship seasons
Western Athletic Conference baseball champion seasons